Dmytro Khlyobas (born 9 May 1994) is a Ukrainian professional footballer who plays as a forward in Armenia for Urartu.

Career
He is the product of FC Dynamo Kyiv sportive school. He made his debut for FC Dynamo entering as a second-half substitute against FC Metalurh Donetsk on 17 November 2012 in the Ukrainian Premier League.

FC Vorskla Poltava
From 2016 he joyed on loan for FC Vorskla Poltava and he got to the quarterfinal of the Ukrainian Cup in the season 2016–17

FC Dinamo Minsk
In 2017 he went on loan to Dinamo Minsk and he got with the team in UEFA Europa League in the season 2017–18.

FC Desna Chernihiv
In 2018, he arrived at the FC Desna Chernihiv and with the new club in Ukrainian Premier League in the season 2018–19 he has been elected best player of the round 2. He got into the Quarterfinals of the Ukrainian Cup in the season 2019–20  for the second time of the history with the club of Chernihiv. In Premier League in the season 2019–20, with the club got the 4th place, through the play-offs for the Championship round table, scoring 7 goals.On 13 December 2020, he scored a goal on the 2–0 victory against FC Mariupol in Kyiv at the NSC Olimpiyskiy. On 24 December 2020, his contract with the club was ended, been the club with most appearances.

Kolos Kovalivka
In January 2021 he moved to Kolos Kovalivka and on 14 February 2021, he made his debut with the new team against Shakhtar Donetsk. He managed to get 4 place in Ukrainian Premier League in season 2020–21 and qualified for the Europa Conference League third qualifying round. On 2 July 2021 he left the club.

Ordabasy
In summer 2021 he moved to Ordabasy in Kazakhstan Premier League. Here he played 8 matches and scored 1 goal and on 23 December 2021 hi scontract with the club was ended and both parties decided to don't extend.

Urartu
In February 2022 he signed for Urartu in Armenian Premier League. Here he got into the final of the Armenian Cup in the season 2021–22. On 8 August he scored against Shirak for the Armenian Premier League and on 20 August 2022, he scored three goals against Noah always in Armenian Premier League for the season 2022–23.

Career statistics

Club

Honours
Dynamo Kyiv
 Ukrainian Super Cup: 2018

Urartu
 Armenian Cup: Runner-up 2021–22

Dinamo Minsk
 Belarusian Premier League: Runner-up 2017

Individual
 Best player round 2 Ukrainian Premier League: 2018–19

Gallery

References

External links 
 
 

1994 births
Living people
People from Lokhvytsia
Ukrainian footballers
Ukraine youth international footballers
Ukraine under-21 international footballers
Association football forwards
FC Dynamo Kyiv players
FC Dynamo-2 Kyiv players
FC Hoverla Uzhhorod players
FC Vorskla Poltava players
FC Dinamo Minsk players
FC Desna Chernihiv players
FC Kolos Kovalivka players
FC Ordabasy players
FC Urartu players
Ukrainian Premier League players
Ukrainian First League players
Belarusian Premier League players
Kazakhstan Premier League players
Armenian Premier League players
Ukrainian expatriate footballers
Expatriate footballers in Belarus
Ukrainian expatriate sportspeople in Belarus
Expatriate footballers in Kazakhstan
Ukrainian expatriate sportspeople in Kazakhstan
Expatriate footballers in Armenia
Ukrainian expatriate sportspeople in Armenia
Sportspeople from Poltava Oblast
21st-century Ukrainian people